Bryce is an unincorporated community in Fayette County, West Virginia, United States.

The community was named in 1912 by railroad officials.

References 

Unincorporated communities in West Virginia
Unincorporated communities in Fayette County, West Virginia